Zellner may refer to:

People
Arnold Zellner (1927–2010), an American economist and statistician 
Arthur J. Zellner (1883–1952), an American screenwriter and studio publicity man
David Zellner, an American film director, screenwriter, and actor
Kathleen Zellner, an American attorney
Lois Zellner (1883–1937), an American screenwriter 
Peppi Zellner (born 1975), an American football player
Peter Zellner (born 1969), an American/Australian designer, professor, author, urban theorist, and educator
Steven Zellner (born 1991), a German footballer 
Tobias Zellner (born 1977), a German footballer
Torrance Zellner (born 1970), an American track and field athlete 
Yuval Zellner (born 1978), an Israeli politician

Planet
a minor planet named Zellner